Peru Nolaskoain Esnal (born 25 October 1998) is a Spanish professional footballer who plays as either a centre-back or a defensive midfielder for SD Eibar, on loan from Athletic Bilbao.

Club career
Born in Zumaia, Gipuzkoa, Basque Country, joined Athletic Bilbao's Lezama in 2015, from Antiguoko. On 13 June 2016, he was promoted to the farm team, but moved straight to the reserves.

Nolaskoain made his senior debut on 21 August 2016, coming on as a first-half substitute for Tarsi and scoring his team's second in a 3–0 Segunda División B home win against UD Socuéllamos. During the 2018 pre-season, he was converted to a central defender by new first-team manager Eduardo Berizzo.

Nolaskoain made his professional – and La Liga – debut on 20 August 2018, starting and scoring the opener in a 2–1 home win against CD Leganés. The following 9 August, after featuring sparingly with the main squad, he was loaned to Segunda División side Deportivo de La Coruña for one year.

In July 2020, suffered a serious ankle injury which kept him out for nearly 18 months. On 21 January 2022, he was loaned to second division side SD Amorebieta for the remainder of the campaign.

On 26 August 2022, Nolaskoain moved to SD Eibar in the second division, on loan for one year.

Career statistics

Club

References

External links

1998 births
Living people
People from Urola Kosta
Sportspeople from Gipuzkoa
Spanish footballers
Footballers from the Basque Country (autonomous community)
Association football defenders
Association football midfielders
Spain youth international footballers
La Liga players
Segunda División players
Segunda División B players
Antiguoko players
Bilbao Athletic footballers
Athletic Bilbao footballers
Deportivo de La Coruña players
SD Amorebieta footballers
SD Eibar footballers